Typoman is an independent video game developed by German indie studio Brainseed Factory for Nintendo Switch, Wii U, Xbox One, PlayStation 4 and PC, and mobile. The game follows a hero named HERO who crafts words to alter the environment around him.

Gameplay
Typoman features a number of environmental puzzles that are solved by crafting words that are relevant to the situation. For example, players can spell "up" to activate an elevator, or "open" to open a door. Situations become increasingly complicated as the game progresses, requiring the player to come up with puns to manipulate items.

Development
The idea of Typoman was born out of a desire to experiment with typography and gameplay. Brainseed Factory founder Bilal Chbib explains that the original plan was to "have objects and monsters shaped out of letters, and nothing else." As development continued the team eventually decided to implement puzzle based gameplay using letters and words.

The game was originally a Wii U exclusive, and Nintendo showcased the game at the Nindies@Home program during E3 2015. The game launched for Wii U in 2015.

A year after release, Brainseed Factory announced an updated version of the game called Typoman: Revised would be released for PC, Xbox One and PS4. The revised version implements several design and graphical improvements. The PC version launched in 2016, with the console versions following in February 2017.

Reception

The original Wii U version of Typoman received mixed reviews from critics, with a score on review aggregator Metacritic of 57/100. Typoman: Revised for Xbox One and PlayStation 4 was better received, scoring 73/100 and 75/100 respectively.

Critics generally praised the game's concept, atmosphere and art style, but directed criticism towards the game's length.

Awards
 Nominee for Best Visual Design, Best Puzzle Game, TIGA Games Industry Awards 2018, London
 Winner Beste Inszenierung (Best Presentation), German Video Game Awards 2016, Munich
 Winner Best Casual Game, Game Connection Development Awards 2015, San Francisco
 Nominee for Best Game, Best Indie Game, Best Sound, Best Game Design, Best Console Game, German Dev Awards 2015, Cologne
 Winner Best Art Style, Gaming Trend's Best of E3 2015 Awards, Los Angeles
 Winner Best of Quo Vadis Show 2015, Best of Quo Vadis Show, Berlin
 Winner Best Youth Game for High Educational Value, Pädi 2016, Munich

References

External links

2015 video games
Indie video games
PlayStation 4 games
Wii U games
Single-player video games
Windows games
Xbox One games
PlayStation Network games
Side-scrolling video games
Microsoft games
Platform games
Puzzle video games
Video games developed in Germany
Nintendo Switch games